In the UK,  a stabling point is a place where rail locomotives are parked while awaiting their next turn of duty.  A stabling point may be fitted with a fuelling point and other minor maintenance facilities. A good example of this was Newport's Godfrey Road stabling point, which has since been closed. Stabling sidings can be just a few roads or large complexes like Feltham Sidings. They are sometimes electrified with a third rail or OLE. An example of a stabling point with third rail would be Feltham marshalling yard which is being made into  carriage sidings for the British Rail Class 701 EMU.

References

 Stabling point